Bleary (likely ) is a small village and townland in County Down, Northern Ireland. It is near the County Armagh border and the settlements of Craigavon, Lurgan and Portadown. In the 2011 Census its population was counted as part of Craigavon. It lies within the Armagh City, Banbridge and Craigavon area.

History

The Troubles
 18 June 1972 - Three British soldiers (Arthur McMillan (aged 37), Ian Mutch (aged 31) and Colin Leslie (aged 26)) were killed in an IRA booby-trap bomb attack. The bomb had been left in a derelict house in Bleary.
 27 April 1975 - Loyalists shot dead three people in Bleary Darts Club. See Bleary Darts Club shooting
 28 October 1993 - The UVF shot dead two Catholic brothers (Gerrard Cairns, 22, and Rory Cairns, 18) at their home in front of their eleven-year-old sister in Bleary, County Down.

Education 
Bleary Primary School

Demography

2011 Census
On Census day (27 March 2011) there were 1,009 people living in Bleary.

 51.5% belong to or were brought up in a 'Protestant and Other Christian (including Christian related)' religion and 40.6% belong to or were brought up in the Catholic religion;

References

See also 
List of towns and villages in Northern Ireland

Villages in County Down
Townlands of County Down
Civil parish of Tullylish